American Journal of Hematology is an academic journal devoted to the coverage of blood diseases. It has been published since 1976. The editor-in-chief is Carlo Brugnara (Harvard Medical School). According to the Journal Citation Reports, the journal has a 2020 impact factor of 10.047, ranking it 7th out of 76 journals in the category "Hematology".

References

Publications established in 1976
Hematology journals
Wiley-Liss academic journals